is a Japanese voice actor. He is attached to Local Dream and was formerly attached to Arts Vision, Sigma Seven and Vi-Vo.

Voice roles

Acrobunch (Jun Rando - debut role, 1982) 
Another Century's Episode 2 (Sho Zama), (Trowa Barton)
Aoki Densetsu Shoot! (Hiroshi Matsushita)
Arion  (Arion)
Aura Battler Dunbine (Sho Zama)
Biker Mice from Mars (Vinnie)
Bondage Queen Kate (Jenkins)
Bosco Adventure (Frog)
Brave Police J-Decker (Kagerou)
Captain Tsubasa (Mamoru Izawa), (Taichi Nakanishi), 
Dancouga - Super Beast Machine God (Masato Shikibu)
Darker than Black (Nick Hillman)
Digimon Xros Wars (Gravimon)
Dogs: Bullets & Carnage (Giovanni)
Domain of Murder (Goro Nanase)
Dragon Ball GT (Android 17 / Hell Fighter 17 / Super 17)
Dragon Ball Super (Android 17)
Dragon Ball Z (Android 17)
Dragon Ball Z Kai (Android 17)
Gundam Wing (Trowa Barton)
Harukanaru Toki no Naka de (Ten no Byakko (Fujiwara no Takamichi, Fujiwara no Yukitaka, Arikawa Yuzuru)
Harukanaru Toki no Naka de4~Ame sora no shou~video games as Chi no Genbu Katsuragi Oshihito
Hello! Lady Lynn (Arthur Drake Brighton)
Ressha Sentai ToQger (Bottle Shadow)
Romeo's Blue Skies (Rinaldo)
Legend of the Galactic Heroes (Franz Varlimont)
Otaku no Video (Hino)
Police Academy: The Animated Series (Proctor)
Saint Seiya (Megrez Delta Alberich, Black Pegasus, and Sho (Steel Saint of Toucan))
Saint Seiya Omega  (Kiki and Sho (Steel Saint of Toucan))
Sengoku Basara (Mouri Motonari)
Shin Captain Tsubasa (Shun Nitta)
Tales of Graces (Lambda)
Tekkaman Blade (Rebin)

Wandaba Style (Kōsaku Tsukomo)
YuYu Hakusho (Yoko Kurama)

Drama CD 

GFantasy Comic CD Collection Fire Emblem: Ankoku Ryū to Hikari no Ken  (Marth)
Vol．1 Yakusoku no Totihe
Vol．2 Honoo　no Monsyou
Vol．3 Kaze no Kiseki
Vol．4 Madou no Seiiki
110 Ban wa Koi no Hajimari series 2: Ban wa Koi no Hajimari (Toshiyuki Tsukidate)
Amai Tsumi no Kakera (Satoshi Katsuragawa)
Ambassador wa Yoru ni Sasayaku (Professor Domyoji)
 Ao no Kiseki series 1: Ao no Kiseki (Kai)
 Ao no Kiseki series 2: Catharsis Spell (Kai)
 Ao no Kiseki series 3: Crystal Crown (Kai)
 Ao no Kiseki series 4: Baroque Pearl (Kai/Ishisu)
 Ao no Kiseki series 5: Persona Non Grata (Kai)
 Ao no Kiseki series 6: Phantom Pain (Kai)
Catch Me! (Shouji Toukai)
Chinmoku no Ookami (Osada)
Convenience Store Lamento (Shui)
Deep Fear Sound Drama (John Mayor)
Eien no Midori ~Nochinoomohini~ (Yuuta Takeuchi)
Endless Series 2: Endless Kiss (Rei Sakuma)
Endless Series side story: Kekkon Shiyouyo (Rei Sakuma)
Gohan wo Tabeyou series 5 (Sakagami)
Hameteyaru! (Tsukasa Nakamura)
Kimi ga Suki Nanosa (Kimiaki Yoshida)
Lamento ~Rhapsody to the Past~ (Shui)
Open Sesame (Shumon Aida)
Stanley Hawk no Jikenbo ~AMBIVALENCE . Katto~ (Lewis)
Wagamama Prisoner (Satoshi Renjou)

Dubbing

Live-action
Beverly Hills, 90210 (Brandon Walsh (Jason Priestley))
BH90210 (Jason Priestley/Brandon Walsh)
The Cave (Jack McAllister (Cole Hauser))
The Doors (Robby Krieger (Frank Whaley))
Friends (Mike Hannigan (Paul Rudd))
The Thin Red Line (Cpl. Geoffrey Fife (Adrien Brody))
Village of the Damned (Frank McGowan (Michael Paré))

Animation
TUGS (Ten Cents)

References

External links
essence, Shigeru Nakahara Official Fan Site (Japanese)
Shigeru Nakahara at the Seiyuu database
 

1961 births
Japanese male voice actors
Living people
People from Kamakura
Male voice actors from Kanagawa Prefecture
20th-century Japanese male actors
21st-century Japanese male actors
Arts Vision voice actors
Sigma Seven voice actors